Aindrila Mukhopadhyay is an American scientist who is the Division Deputy of the Biological Systems and Engineering Division at Lawrence Berkeley National Laboratory. Her research involves microbial engineering for the production of biofuels. She was nominated a Fellow of the American Association for the Advancement of Science in 2022.

Early life and education 
Mukhopadhyay was born in Bengal, India. Her father is a surgeon and a painter. She was a bachelor's student in chemistry and zoology at the Isabella Thoburn College. For her postdoctoral research, she studied chemistry at the Indian Institute of Technology. She moved to the University of Chicago in 1996, where she worked toward a doctorate in organic chemistry. She held a joint position at Emory University. After earning her doctorate, Mukhopadhyay joined Lawrence Berkeley National Laboratory as a postdoctoral researcher.

Research and career 
Mukhopadhyay leads biological systems and engineering at the Lawrence Berkeley National Laboratory, where she engineers microbes to make sustainable and low-cost chemicals. She studies biological processes (e.g. stress response, signaling and membrane transport) in microbial systems. Mukhopadhyay makes use of a variety of biochemical approaches to understand environmentally important model (sulphate and cyanobacteria) and non-model organisms (Pseudomonas stutzeri, Desulfovibrio vulgaris and Agrobacterium tumefaciens). She is part of the United States Department of Energy Enigma project.

Mukhopadhyay combines protein and host engineering to improve the production fuels, using microbes such as Escherichia coli and Corynebacterium glutamicum. In 2016, Mukhopadhyay engineered a bacterial strain that can permit the one-pot production of biofuels from a slurry. The strain had an amino acid mutation on the rcd gene, and was particularly tolerant to ionic liquids.

Alongside her work on biofuels, Mukhopadhyay has investigated environmentally-friendly pigments. She investigated how well Rhodosporidium toruloides can express nonribosomal peptide synthetases. She showed that Rhodosporidium toruloides (a fungus) bioengineered to convert amino acid molecules into indigoidine, a blue pigment that can be used in the textile industry. She showed that for every liter of bioreactor culture it was possible to generate 86 grams of indigoidine, which was the highest yield ever reported.

Muchpadhyay is vice president of the Biofuels and Bioproducts Division at the Joint BioEnergy Institute (JBEI), where she oversees host engineering.

Awards and honors 
 2019 Finalist C3E Awards: Mid-career women in clean energy
 2022 Fellow of the American Association for the Advancement of Science

Selected publications

Personal life 
Mukhopadhyay is an artist.

References 

Living people
Isabella Thoburn College alumni
IIT Bombay alumni
University of Chicago alumni
Indian emigrants to the United States
Lawrence Berkeley National Laboratory people
Fellows of the American Association for the Advancement of Science
21st-century American women scientists
21st-century American scientists
Year of birth missing (living people)